Henry George Woods (16 June 1842 – 19 July 1915) was an Anglican clergyman and academic. He was President of Trinity College, Oxford, from 1887 to 1897 and Master of the Temple from 1904 to 1915.

Early life
Woods was born on 16 June 1842 in Woodend, Northamptonshire. He was educated at Lancing College, an Anglican public school in Lancing, West Sussex. As an exhibitioner and later a scholar, he studied classics at Corpus Christi College, Oxford. He gained a first in Mods in 1863 and a first in Greats in 1865.

Academic career
In 1865, Woods was elected a fellow of Trinity College, Oxford. In 1866, he was appointed a tutor. He served as bursar from 1867 to 1887. In 1887, he was elected President of Trinity College, Oxford. He resigned the post in 1897; his wife's health was deteriorating at the time and this was given as the reason for his resignation. He was elected an honorary fellow of Trinity College in 1898.

Religious life
On 23 December 1866, Woods was ordained a deacon in the Church of England by Samuel Wilberforce, the then Bishop of Oxford, at Christ Church Cathedral, Oxford. He was ordained a priest the following year. From 1900 to 1904, he was rector of Little Gaddesden, Hertfordshire. In 1904, he was appointed Master of the Temple, the lead cleric of the Temple Church, London. The Temple Church was the headquarters of the Knights Templar before they were disbanded in the 14th century.

He died on 19 July 1915 at the Master's House, his home in London as Master of the Temple. He was buried at Holywell Cemetery in Oxford.

Personal life
In 1879, Woods married Margaret Louisa Bradley, a novelist and poet. She was the daughter of George Bradley, an academic and senior priest, who served as Dean of Westminster from 1881 to 1902. Woods and his wife had three sons.

References

1842 births
1915 deaths
20th-century English Anglican priests
19th-century English Anglican priests
Presidents of Trinity College, Oxford
People educated at Lancing College
Alumni of Corpus Christi College, Oxford
People from West Northamptonshire District
Burials at Holywell Cemetery
Masters of the Temple